Vodňany is a town in Strakonice District in the South Bohemian Region of the Czech Republic. It has about 6,800 inhabitants. The historic town centre is well preserved and is protected by law as an urban monument zone, Vodňany's administrative part of Křtětice is protected as a village monument zone.

Administrative parts
Vodňany are made up of town parts of Vodňany I and Vodňany II and villages of Čavyně, Hvožďany, Křtětice, Pražák, Radčice, Újezd and Vodňanské Svobodné Hory.

Geography

It lies mostly in the České Budějovice Basin.

The town is situated on the right bank of the Blanice River. The territory is rich in fish ponds.

History
Vodňany was originally a Slavic settlement, gradually transformed into a market town. Its typical colonization ground plan with a regular network of streets and a large regular square testifies to its origin during the reign of King Ottokar II of Bohemia. The first written mention of Vodňany is from 1336, when it was promoted to a town by King John of Bohemia. In 1400, Vodňany is referred to as a royal town.

For centuries, the town profited from the old trade route and the collection of customs duties. Originally, the mining of precious metals was also planned, but it was never fully developed, and the town's orientation towards pond farming became much more profitable. Since the second half of the 15th century, the town established ponds, which are still a characteristic feature of the landscape.

Demographics

Economy
The largest employer in the town and the region, and the largest processor of poultry meat and the only processor of duck meat in the Czech Republic, is Vodňanská drůbež, a.s. company, part of the Agrofert holding.

The pond farming tradition continues to this day. A common carp bred in this town called "Omega3kapr" is healthier thanks to special feed and breeding conditions and is a registered trademark.

Education and science

In 1920, the Secondary Fishing School was founded in Vodňany, and exists to this day. In 1996, a vocational school was founded by the secondary school, and since then the school's name is Secondary Fishing School and Higher Vocational School of Water Management and Ecology Vodňany.

In 1953, Research Institute of Fish Culture and Hydrobiology was founded in the town. In 2009, the institute became a part of Faculty of Fisheries and Protection of Waters of University of South Bohemia in České Budějovice.

Sights

The most valuable building of Vodňany and the main landmark of the town square is the Church of the Nativity of the Virgin Mary. Existence of the church was mentioned already in 1317. In 1894–1897, it was rebuilt into its current neo-Gothic form. The second church in the town is Church of Saint John the Baptist.

There are still remains of the town fortifications from the first half of the 15th century, represented by town walls with square bastions.

In the former synagogue there is a museum with exhibitions of the history of the town fishing in the town.

Notable people
Jan Campanus Vodňanský (1572–1622), writer
Julius Zeyer (1841–1901), writer, poet, and playwright; lived here
Jan Zrzavý (1890–1977), painter; lived here in 1942–1958
Váša Příhoda (1900–1960), violinist
Anna Bolavá (born 1981), writer

Twin towns – sister cities

Vodňany is twinned with:
 Kisbér, Hungary
 Oravský Podzámok, Slovakia
 Sieraków, Poland
 Wartberg ob der Aist, Austria
 Zlaté Hory, Czech Republic

References

External links

Unofficial website

Cities and towns in the Czech Republic
Populated places in Strakonice District
Prácheňsko